San Elijo may refer to:

San Elijo Lagoon
San Elijo Middle School
San Elijo College
San Elijo Hills, California
San Elijo State Beach